Lisa Ann Spoonauer (December 16, 1972 – May 20, 2017) was an American former character actress best known for the role of Caitlin Bree in Clerks, which she reprised for an episode in Clerks: The Animated Series.

Biography
Spoonauer was born in Rahway, New Jersey, and raised in Freehold Township. She attended Brookdale Community College, where she was spotted (in an acting class) by Clerks director Kevin Smith, who was having difficulty casting the part of Caitlin. He offered her the role and a script, and she later accepted. Spoonauer's only other film credit is for the Gabe Torres' film Bartender.

Personal life
Spoonauer began dating her Clerks co-star Jeff Anderson in 1993, and they were married for one year from 1998 to 1999. According to the documentary Snowball Effect: The Story of Clerks, included on the 10th anniversary DVD release, Anderson proposed to her on the set of the film.

Spoonauer later married her second husband Tom Caron and relocated to Jackson Township, where she became a restaurant manager and event planner. Spoonauer has a daughter with Caron and a stepson from Caron's previous marriage.

Death
Spoonauer died at age 44 on May 20, 2017, of an accidental overdose of hydromorphone. It was also revealed that she was fighting cancer, anemia, lung disease and immune deficiency, which were all factors in her death.

Her brother Mike, on a fundraising page for Patient Advocate Foundation Inc., related that she had been long suffering from a chronic illness. Spoonauer had travelled to the Mayo Clinic in 2014 for treatment; a Facebook post from that time revealed that she had already been seeing "countless other specialists over the last 7 years".

Clerks co-stars Brian O'Halloran and Marilyn Ghigliotti both shared the news and posted tributes to their personal Facebook accounts on May 23, 2017.

Kevin Smith posted a tribute to Spoonauer via his personal Instagram account and during an episode of his podcast Hollywood Babble-On. Clerks III, released in 2022, is dedicated to Spoonauer.

She was survived by her husband, daughter Mia, and stepson Tyler.

Filmography
Clerks (1994)
Bartender (1997)
Clerks: The Animated Series (2002)
Shooting Clerks (2016) (special thanks)

References

External links
 
 

1972 births
2017 deaths
American film actresses
American voice actresses
Actresses from New Jersey
People from Rahway, New Jersey
20th-century American actresses
21st-century American actresses
Drug-related deaths in New Jersey
Accidental deaths in New Jersey
Brookdale Community College alumni